is the 4th single by the Japanese idol girl group Onyanko Club. It was released in Japan on April 21, 1986.

Outline 
This song praises the bullying of a high school girl who sets up a nerdy-looking man as a molester by accident when the man truly wanted to give the girl a love letter.

The song was banned from being commercially used on television sometime after its release.

The lyrics are considered incredibly horrible in light of the 21st century, where molestation crimes have been severely punished and false accusations of molestation have also become a problem. On the other hand, at the time this was released, music critic  commented as follows. "The content depicted in the lyrics can be forgiven because it is a cute bullying by a high school girl. This is a mischievous song".

Track listing

Charts

Weekly charts

Year-end charts

References

External links 
 Onyanko Club "Otto Chikan!" (7" single) at Discogs

Onyanko Club songs
1986 songs
1986 singles
Songs with lyrics by Yasushi Akimoto
Pony Canyon singles
Oricon Weekly number-one singles